Jennifer and Kevin McCoy are a Brooklyn, New York-based married couple who make art together, and still continue to make projects together. They work with interactive media, film, performance and installation to explore personal experience in relation with new technology, the mass media, and global commerce with work that is highly influenced through the perspective of Lev Manovich.  They often re-examine classic genres and works of cinema, science fiction or television narrative, creating sculptural objects, net art, robotic movies or live performance They have projects that are collection of subcategories. In 2002 they received the Creative Capital Award in the discipline of Emerging Fields. They were awarded a 2011 Guggenheim Fellowship. In 2014, Kevin collaborated with Anil Dash to co-create Monegraph, short for “monetized graphics” The work "Quantum", was included in Sotheby's "Natively Digital: A Curated NFT Sale" in June 2021.

Artwork
In 1999, Jennifer and Kevin McCoy undertook the "World Views" residency programmed on the World Trade Center's 91st floor. From this residency, the artists developed a series of interventions into global capitalism. For example, the McCoys created web-based banner ads satirizing corporate aesthetics and jargon. The artists then used the Doubleclick.com network to distribute 1 million of these banner ads over one month, from mid-August to mid-September 1999. Doubleclick.com, which sponsored the project, did not inform sites on which the ads were displayed that they were playing host to an artistic intervention.

The McCoys are well known for their database pieces, in which they break down a series of films or TV shows into individual shots, and categorize them according to a classification schema of their own making. For example, the piece 'Every Shot Every Episode' (2001) was a collection of 10,000 shots from the Starsky and Hutch television series that were categorized according to 278 categories such as 'every plaid', 'every sexy outfit', 'every yellow Volkswagen'. Shots relating to each category were then burned to video CD and installed on a shelf in the gallery along with a small, specially designed video player.

In 2002, the McCoys created "Horror Chase." According to their website (mccoyspace.com) " This work is based on the climatic chase sequence from Evil Dead II. The artists re-enact the scene on a specially designed stage set. Each shot in the sequence is individually digitized. Custom computer software selects these clips at random, playing them back in a seamless but continuously variable way, changing the speed and direction of play. The images are projected at cinematic scale and the computer hardware is installed in a black briefcase, which forms part of the installation."

In 2004, the dormant Saarinen-designed TWA Flight Center (now Jetblue Terminal 5) at JFK Airport briefly hosted an art exhibition called Terminal 5 curated by Rachel K. Ward and featuring the work of 18 artists including Jennifer & Kevin McCoy. The show featured work, lectures and temporary installations drawing inspiration from the idea of travel — and the terminal's architecture. The show was to run from October 1, 2004 to January 31, 2005 — though it closed abruptly after the building itself was vandalized during the opening party.

More recently, the McCoys have been creating works that use miniature dioramas similar to model railroads or dolls' houses. Live video cameras are embedded in each diorama, capturing the miniature figures and landscapes from various angles. The resulting video feeds are then sequenced by special computer software which acts as the film editor, creating a real-time animated film sequence to be projected on the gallery wall. In 'Soft Rains' (2003), the McCoys recreated archetypal scenes from cinema in this miniature form, making references to films such as Goldfinger, Friday the 13th, and Blue Velvet. 'Soft Rains' consisted of 6 installations: 'Beach Adventure,' "Cabaret,' 'Dinner Party,' 'The Loft,' 'The Spa,' and 'Suburban Horror.' The 'Traffic' series (2004) were recreations of moments from the artists' personal histories when they had a particular memory of viewing specific films. For example, Traffic #1: Our Second Date recreates the McCoys' second date when they went to see a film by Jean-Luc Godard at a cinema in Paris.

"I'll Replace You," (2008) offered a glimpse of the private life of the McCoys. The McCoy's staged scenes of their daily routines such as waking up, getting their children ready, teaching, meeting up with friends, etc.Kevin and Jennifer are 'replaced' by actors. Fifty actors were hired. In 2012 at Project Space in Seattle, WA set up a project called "Northwest Passing." The artists borrowed work from collectors of northwest art. They then hired actors who knew nothing of the work to give improvised tours. Use of the term passing refers to actors 'passing' as experts, Jennifer and Kevin 'passing' as northwest artists, and the art itself 'passing' as northwest art.

Biography

The McCoys met in Paris in 1990. They subsequently studied together at Rensselaer Polytechnic Institute in Troy, New York where they both received their MFA in Electronic Art, studying in part under Pauline Oliveros.

Articles about their work have appeared in Art in America, Artforum,
The Wire, dArt International, Spin Magazine, Feed, and The Independent.  They won a Wired Magazine Rave Award, in the Art Category for 2005. Their work is held in museum collections including the Metropolitan Museum of Art, MoMA, and Mudam. A number of individual collectors also own their work, including actor Bill Paxton.

Jennifer is a Professor in the Art Department at Brooklyn College. Kevin is Associate Professor in the Department of Art and Art Professions at New York University.
The McCoys have been involved in academic programs at MoMA and the Whitney Museum. They live and work in Brooklyn, New York.

Notable works

Soft Rains (2003)
A series of archetypal cinema scenes recreated in a series of miniature tableaux. Dozens of live video cameras are trained on the dioramas from a variety of angles. Custom computer software sequences the live feeds into an endlessly repeating vignette, presented as projection on the gallery wall. The system functions as a computer controlled soundstage that produces animated films in the gallery in real time.

Airworld (1999)
Explores the interconnections between airports, and the convergence of travel and everyday life, especially the dissolution of the barriers between personal life, professional life, personal space and community space.

Small Appliances (1997)
Ten short video narratives based around women's experiences with technology. Video and CD-Rom based artwork intended for exposition on the internet and in galleries.

Awards

 2011   Fellowship, John Simon Guggenheim Memorial Foundation, New York, NY
 2002   Emerging Fields Grant, Creative Capital Foundation, New York, NY
 2001    Finishing Funds Grant, Experimental Television Center, Owego, NY
 2001    New Media Art Fellowship, Colbert Foundation, New York, NY
 2000    Net Art Commission/Residency, The Alternative Museum, New York, NY
 1999    New York Foundation for the Arts Computer Arts Grant recipient, New York, NY
 1999    "World Views" Thundergulch Artist in Residence, New York, NY
 1999    "Emerging Artist/Emergent Media" Grant recipient presented by the Jerome Foundation through the Walker Art Center, Minneapolis, MN
 1999    Harvestworks Artist in Residence, New York, NY.

References

External links
 McCoy Space
 Postmasters Gallery
 "Our Work in 4 Ltrs. (or less)" Jennifer & Kevin McCoy use small words to describe their collaboration. March 6, 2002

Art duos
American digital artists
Women digital artists
Living people
Postmodern artists
Artists from New York (state)
New media artists
American installation artists
American conceptual artists
Postmodernists
Rensselaer Polytechnic Institute alumni
Pupils of Pauline Oliveros
21st-century American women artists
Year of birth missing (living people)
Brooklyn College faculty
Date of birth missing (living people)